Abdulrahman Al-Saeed (born 7 August 1991) is a football player who plays for Al-Rayyan as a defender.

References

External links
 

1991 births
Living people
Saudi Arabian footballers
Association football defenders
Al Hilal SFC players
Al-Wehda Club (Mecca) players
Al-Hazem F.C. players
Al-Kawkab FC players
Al-Shoulla FC players
Al-Mujazzal Club players
Khaleej FC players
Al-Riyadh SC players
Al-Entesar Club players
Al-Rayyan Club (Saudi Arabia) players
Saudi First Division League players
Saudi Professional League players
Saudi Second Division players
Place of birth missing (living people)